East Hampton is a station on the Montauk Branch of the Long Island Rail Road, on Railroad Avenue between Newtown Lane and Race Lane, in East Hampton, New York. Parking is available along Railroad Avenue as far west as King Street. A bus/taxi lane is in front of the station house.

History
East Hampton station was built in 1895 by the Brooklyn and Montauk Railroad. The original station house survives, and was placed on the National Register of Historic Places on June 2, 2000. In 2005, it was open only on Sundays.

In October 2017, the MTA announced that it was planning to restore East Hampton Station to its original brick structure and green roofline, as part of a $120 million state reconstruction program for 16 LIRR stations in Nassau and Suffolk Counties.

Station layout
The station has one six-car-long high-level platform on the south side of the single track.

Gallery

References

External links 

March 2000 Photo (Unofficial LIRR Station Website)
Photo of station from the 1960s by Steve Hoskins (NYCSubways.org)
Maps and aerial photos

Unofficial LIRR Photography Site
East Hampton Station
 Station House from Google Maps Street View

Long Island Rail Road stations in Suffolk County, New York
The Hamptons, New York
Railway stations on the National Register of Historic Places in New York (state)
Railway stations in the United States opened in 1895
Long Island Rail Road
National Register of Historic Places in Suffolk County, New York